Sandra Grieve is a Scottish politician. She is a member of the Scottish Liberal Democrats and has served in official positions for that party, including vice-president for Scotland. In March 2019 she was appointed as the party's senior adjudicator for Scotland.

Political career
In 1989, Grieve served as a member of the Scottish Constitutional Convention, which crafted a framework for Scottish devolution. During the 2014 Scottish independence referendum, Grieves initially supported the "no" side, but was motivated to change her vote to pro-independence after seeing the advert by the Better Together campaign titled "The woman who made up her mind". Grieve explained: "The camera shots of her wedding ring seemed out of touch with the many social arrangements we enjoy in modern Scotland, and the subliminal message of 'staying together for the kids' made me feel a bit sick!"

References

Year of birth missing (living people)
Living people
Scottish Liberal Democrat politicians
20th-century Scottish politicians
20th-century Scottish women politicians
21st-century Scottish politicians
21st-century Scottish women politicians